Kosovskoye Lake is a lake in Russia near Shimsk.

References

Lakes of Novgorod Oblast